The 1935 King's Birthday and Silver Jubilee Honours in New Zealand, celebrating the official birthday of King George V and the silver jubilee of his reign, were appointments made by the King to various orders and honours to reward and highlight good works by New Zealanders. They were announced on 3 June 1935.

The recipients of honours are displayed here as they were styled before their new honour.

Viscount
 The Right Honourable Charles, Baron Bledisloe  – lately Governor-General of New Zealand.

Knight Bachelor
 Francis Vernon Frazer – deputy chairman of executive, Commission of Agriculture.
 Henry Horton – of Auckland. For public services.

Order of the Bath

Companion (CB)
Military division, additional
 Colonel Frank Symon  – of Wellington; Director of Artillery, Royal New Zealand Artillery.

Order of Saint Michael and Saint George

Knight Grand Cross (GCMG)
Additional
 The Honourable Sir Christopher James Parr  – High Commissioner for New Zealand in London.

Knight Commander (KCMG)
Additional
 The Honourable Ethelbert Alfred Ransom – Minister of Lands.

Companion (CMG)
Additional
 Professor John Rawson Elder  – of Dunedin; professor of history at the University of Otago.
 Thomas Charles Atkinson Hislop – mayor of Wellington.

Order of the British Empire

Knight Commander (KBE)
Civil division, additional
 Brigadier-General Herbert Ernest Hart    – administrator of Western Samoa.

 Military division, additional
 Major-General Sir William Livingstone Hatchwell Sinclair-Burgess  – New Zealand Staff Corps, General Officer Commanding and Chief of the General Staff, New Zealand Military Forces.

Commander (CBE)
Civil division, additional
 Ernest Marsden   – secretary, Department of Scientific and Industrial Research.
 Michael Herbert Watt  – Director-General of Health.

Military division, additional
 Colonel William Henry Cunningham  – of Wellington; commander, 2nd New Zealand Infantry Brigade.
 Colonel Herbert Clarence Hurst  – of Christchurch; commander, 3rd New Zealand Mounted Rifles Brigade.

Officer (OBE)
Civil division, additional
 John William Collins – trade and tourist commissioner in Canada and the United States of America.
 Charles Frederick Goldie – of Auckland. For services to art.
 Lucinda Henrietta Wilson – of Auckland. For public and philanthropic services.

Civil division, honorary
 Makea Karika Takau – a leading female ariki of the Cook Islands.
 Mata'afa Salanoa Muliufi – a leading chief of Western Samoa.

Military division, additional
 Lieutenant-Colonel William Robert Lang  – of Waipu; officer commanding, North Auckland Mounted Rifles.
 Lieutenant-Colonel Robert Gracie Milligan  – of Auckland; officer commanding 1st Field Brigade, New Zealand Artillery.

Member (MBE)
Civil division, additional
 Johannes Carl Andersen – of Wellington; librarian, Alexander Turnbull Library.
 Arthur Kingsley Bell – of Wellington. For services in connection with the Legion of Frontiersmen.
 Walter Bromley – deputy chairman, Unemployment Board.
 The Reverend Jasper Cyril Austin Calder – of Auckland. For charitable and philanthropic services.
 Mary Hobhouse Chatfield – of Wellington. For social-welfare and philanthropic services.
 Annie Isabel Fraer – of Christchurch. For public services.
 Dr Doris Clifton Gordon  – of Stratford. For services in connection with maternal and child welfare.
 Edith Annie Howes – of Dunedin. For public services.
 William Alfred James – New Zealand government agent at Vancouver.
 Marianne Caughey Preston – of Auckland. For philanthropic services.

Military division, additional
 Flight-Lieutenant Maurice William Buckley – of Christchurch; Royal New Zealand Air Force.
 Captain George Dittmer  – of Auckland; New Zealand Staff Corps.
 Captain Peter William Gordon Spiers  – of Dunedin; Otago Regiment, New Zealand Military Forces.

Companion of the Imperial Service Order (ISO)
 Alfred Ernest Allison – lately Government Insurance commissioner.
 Dr George Craig  – lately comptroller of Customs.

References

Birthday Honours
1935 awards
1935 in New Zealand
New Zealand awards